Trollz is an American animated television series produced by DIC Entertainment and features the adventures of five teenaged female trolls, who call themselves the Best Friends for Life, who use magic every day to help them with their everyday life as well as battling whatever magical creatures and issues they may find themselves up against in their everyday lives. These trolls were based on the troll doll created in the 1960s.

A single season was produced with a total of 27 episodes. A second season was planned, but was later cancelled.

Characters

Main
The main characters in the series are collectively known as the "Best Friends For Life".

 Amethyst van der Troll (voiced by Britt McKillip): Amethyst is the leader of the BFFL. She is a young and pretty girl who loves her friends and would do anything for them. Amethyst is also considerate and gives good advice to her friends. Her gem is a pinkish-purple heart. She wears a lavender midriff top with a matching skirt and a fuchsia sash. She also wears fuchsia flats with white straps. Her hair is pink and wavy with a purple heart-shaped hairclip. She also wears pink heart-shaped earrings and a purple heart-shaped anklet. Her eyes are pinkish-purple and she has pink spell beads. Her favorite color is pink. Her boyfriend is Coal and her Ancient is her grandmother.
 Ruby Trollman (voiced by Chiara Zanni): She is the bossy girl and second-in-command of the BFFL, and, as such, is really pushy and cares about her looks a bit too much. She is the lancer of the group. If she really wants something, she will do anything to get it. Her hair is red which is done with a star-shaped style and her eyes are red and her natural hair color is brown. She has a red star gem. She wears an off-shoulder white midriff top with a green star design, and yellow and blue sneakers. She also wears a black necklace with a red jewel, and a gold charm bracelet with a gold star. Her favorite color is red. Her spell beads are red. Her boyfriend is Rock and her Ancient is Obsidian.
 Sapphire Trollzawa (voiced by Alexandra Carter): She is the smartest girl in the BFFL. When the friends have slumber parties, Sapphire just wants to study. Her gem is a blue flower. She wears a long-sleeved blue sweater with a white shirt, a pink skirt, ankle socks, and pink loafers with a blue flower on top of it. Her hair is blue and styled in a high ponytail by a pink hairbow. She has glasses on top of her head, her eyes are baby blue, her favorite color is blue. She has blue spell beads. Her boyfriend is Alabaster and her Ancient is Mr. Trollheimer.
 Topaz Trollhopper (voiced by Leah Juel): She is a troll who is nervous and clumsy, loves shopping, is a fashion expert, and is the big guy of the group. Her gem is a yellow diamond. She wears a white midriff top with a pink vest over it, a green miniskirt with a pink and white sash, cream-colored socks, and multicolored platform sneakers. Her hair is dirty blonde and messy, but styled in a ponytail alongside a green scrunchie. She has amber eyes, her favorite color is yellow. She has yellow spell beads. Her boyfriend is Jasper and her Ancient is Zirconia.
 Onyx Von Trollenberg (voiced by Anna van Hooft): She is a goth girl and has a liking for poetry. She is kind but a bit defensive. Her gem is a purplish-black moon. She wears a black long-sleeved midriff top with a white tank top with pink polka dots, a black skirt, lavender tights, and black boots. Her hair is purple and styled in Afro puffs which are tied in buckled scrunchies, her eyes are dark purple and she wears multiple ear piercings on both ears and a silver choker, her favorite color is purple. Her spell beads are purple. Her boyfriend is Flint and her Ancient is Spinell.

Villains
 Simon (voiced by Reece Thompson): Simon the Gremlin is the main villain of the series and appears in numerous episodes throughout the show trying to take over the world of Trollzopolis and get revenge against the Best Friends For Life.
 Snarf (voiced by Janyse Jaud): A half-dog, half-ogre creature and Simon's loyal henchman who sticks by his side despite enduring endless abuse. Able to change from a cute-looking puppy to a hulking beast-like form at will.

Supporting

Boyz
 Coal Trollwell (voiced by Jesse Moss): He is a very clumsy Troll often getting into trouble. Boyfriend to Amethyst.
 Rock Trollhammer (voiced by Matt Hill): Rock is a muscular troll with tall blue hair. He is very dimwitted and forgetful. Boyfriend to Ruby.
 Alabaster Trollington III (voiced by Samuel Vincent): Alabaster is a mild-mannered troll with blond hair and rectangular glasses. He is a multi-millionaire, whose father owns a lot of the companies in Trollzopolis. Boyfriend to Sapphire.
 Jasper Trollhound (voiced by Armen Weitzman): During the first episode, Amethyst cast a spell which cost Jasper his hair. However, Jasper has grown used to his new bald appearance and Jasper himself doesn't mind. Boyfriend to Topaz.
 Flint Trollentino (voiced by Mike Antonakos): He is in a rock band, and loves writing poetry. Boyfriend to Onyx.

Ancients
 Grandma Van Der Troll: Amethyst's Ancient/Grandmother.
 Obsidian: Ruby's Ancient and owner of Obsidian's Spell Shop.
 Mr. Slate Trollheimer (voiced by Jason Connery): Sapphire's Ancient and the girls' teacher.
 Zirconia: Topaz's Ancient and Spinell's wife.
 Spinell: Onyx's Ancient and Zirconia's husband.

Rivals
 Coral Trollarwise: Coral is the senior captain of the cheerleaders. She is in constant rivalry with Ruby, usually for a cute boy's attention. Her gem is maroon. Her gem is shaped like an ace of spades.
 Opal Trollangel: Opal is Coral's main friend. She has tan skin and light-pink hair with a sky blue hair tie. Her gem is in the shape of an oval.
 Jade Trollcroft: Jade is Coral's secondary friend. She has spiky lime green hair. Her gem is in the shape of a thin diamond.

Other
 Kaboom: A dim-witted but friendly volunteer at Obsidian's shop who tends to be the subject of spell bead experiments during the "Spell Moments" at the end of episodes. Originally, he was meant to be a major character, but was reduced in this role instead.

Additional voices

 Mike Antonakos
 Ashleigh Ball
 Molly Bolt
 Maria Dimon
 Ben Einstein
 Brian George
 Michael Heyward
 Matt Hill
 Janyse Jaud
 Ellen Kennedy
 Connor Lee McGuire
 Vincent Maliani
 Blu Mankuma
 Christine Moore
 Jane Mortifee
 Jesse Moss
 Richard Newman
 Christina Pazsitzky
 Alan Young
 Ellie Stenehjem
 Alexandra Thompoulos
 Reece Thompson
 Lee Tockar
 Stevie Vallance
 Samuel Vincent
 Lizzy Walker
 Janet Wells
 Dale Wilson

Spell phones
Spell Phones are devices based on real-life cellphones, but are adapted to provide functions for magic and spellbeads as well as provide the standard functions of a normal cellphone. "Spell Calls" are used to cast spells on other Trollz across long distances. To initiate a Spell Call, the caller places a spell bead in the spell bead slot after inciting the incantation and then dialing the phone number of the intended recipient and hitting the cast button. The Spell Phone then transfers the spell through the phone line and when the recipient picks up the phone the spell is released through the receiver of the phone. It is a useful function that allows Trollz to cast spells across long distances, but a lot of teenagers misuse the function and instead use it to play pranks.

Spell Moments
At the end of each episode, short 30-second segments called "Spell Moments" are featured. These feature one of the BBFL summoning a random or weird spell at a male Troll called "Kaboom", which usually leads to unusual situations.

In the DVDs, those are not featured, rather one segment would be featured on each one as a Bonus Feature.

Episodes

Broadcast & home media release
The "Best Friends for Life" movie originally premiered on Disney Channel on August 27, 2005 (later reairing on Toon Disney in the next month) and then began its regular series run on the syndicated DIC Kids Network E/I block in 2005. The series would later re-air on the Cookie Jar TV block on CBS. As of 2022, the series is currently streamimg on Tubi.

In Ireland, the series aired on RTÉ Two from 28 September 2005 to 2006.

In the UK and France, the series aired on CBBC and TF1 respectively. In the UK, the series would re-air on Pop Girl.

In several international regions including Australia, Spain, Scandinavia and Asia, the series aired on Nickelodeon.

In that year, DIC signed a deal with Warner Home Video to release Trollz DVDs in most regions. These DVDs would each feature the 3 episodes that would form up a respective story arc, with extra footage were not featured on the TV versions. The first two DVDs were known as Best Friends for Life - The Movie and Magic of the Five - The Movie, which were released in September 2005 and contained episodes 1-3 and 4-6 respectively. Rumoredly, Warner Home Video planned to release Hair Over Heels and You Glow Girls in Spring 2006, which would have contained Episodes 7-9 and 10-12 respectively, but no such release occurred.

In August 2007, NCircle Entertainment re-issued both Best Friends for Life and The Magic of the Five and would then release the then-scrapped Hair Over Heels - The Movie in December 2007. You Glow Girls! - The Movie was planned to finally get a DVD release in June 2008 alongside A Hair A-Fair - The Movie, which would have contained Episodes 13-15, but were both cancelled.

These story-arc versions of the Trollz episodes would later see a release on Netflix, including the rest of the scrapped ones.

BBC DVD released Best Friends for Life in the UK in 2006, while in France TF1 Video released "La Magie des Cinq" in October 2009 through their TFOU Video label.

References

External links
 

2000s American animated television series
2000s American daily animated television series
2005 American television series debuts
2005 American television series endings
American children's animated action television series
American children's animated adventure television series
American children's animated comedy television series
American children's animated education television series
American children's animated fantasy television series
BBC children's television shows
Anime-influenced Western animated television series
Trolls in popular culture
CBS original programming
Dam dolls
English-language television shows
First-run syndicated television programs in the United States
Television series by DIC Entertainment
YTV (Canadian TV channel) original programming
Toon Disney original programming
Gemstones in fiction
Television series by DHX Media
Teen animated television series